Jeremy Roger Hansen  (born January 27, 1976) is a current CSA astronaut. He was selected to join the CSA in the 2009 CSA selection along with David Saint-Jacques. Prior to his selection as one of Canada's astronauts, Hansen was a Royal Canadian Air Force captain, piloting the CF-18 fighter jet at CFB Cold Lake, Alberta. He has since been promoted to the rank of colonel.

Biography
Hansen was born January 27, 1976, in London, Ontario, and raised on a farm near Ailsa Craig, Ontario, until moving to Ingersoll for his high school years. Hansen is married and has three children.

In 2013, Hansen served as cavenaut into the ESA CAVES training in Sardinia, alongside Satoshi Furukawa, Michael Barratt, Jack Fisher, Aleksei Ovchinin and Paolo Nespoli. 

On June 10, 2014, NASA announced that Hansen would serve as an aquanaut aboard the Aquarius underwater laboratory during the NEEMO 19 undersea exploration mission, which began on September 7, 2014, and lasted seven days.

Education
Hansen holds a Bachelor of Science degree in space science (First Class Honours) from Royal Military College in Kingston, Ontario (1999). He earned a Master of Science degree in physics from the same institution in 2000, with a research focus on Wide Field of View Satellite Tracking.

Honours and awards
Canadian Forces Decoration – 12 Years of Outstanding Service (October 2006)
Canadian Air Force Pilot Wings (May 2002)
Clancy Scheldrup Memorial Trophy – Outstanding Graduate on the Basic Flying Course (2001)
Air Cadet League of Canada Award – Top Air Force Graduate from the Royal Military College of Canada (May 1999)
Fellow of the Royal Canadian Geographical Society
Gold Medal of the Royal Canadian Geographical Society

References

External links
 CSA Biography of Jeremy R. Hansen
 Spacefacts biography of Jeremy Hansen

1976 births
Living people
Canadian astronauts
People from London, Ontario
People from Ingersoll, Ontario
Royal Military College of Canada alumni
Royal Canadian Air Force officers
Canadian aviators
Aquanauts
Royal Canadian Geographical Society fellows